Ali Emadi is a Canada Excellence Research Chair in Hybrid Powertrain at McMaster University in Hamilton, Ontario.

He was named a Fellow of the Institute of Electrical and Electronics Engineers (IEEE) in 2013 for his contributions to electric power conversion and control for electric and hybrid vehicles. In 2017, he was named a fellow of the National Academy of Inventors.

References

External links

20th-century births
Living people
Texas A&M University alumni
Academic staff of McMaster University
Fellow Members of the IEEE
Year of birth missing (living people)
Place of birth missing (living people)